The Upper Highway Area is a region west of the city of Durban in KwaZulu-Natal, South Africa.

It includes the main suburbs of Kloof and Hillcrest, as well as the smaller areas of Assagay, Botha's Hill, Forest Hills, Gillitts, Waterfall and Winston Park.

The M13 highway passes through the area as well as the Lower Highway Area of Pinetown and Westville.

References 

Geography of KwaZulu-Natal
Suburbs of Durban